Old Mission Church is the oldest Protestant Church, and the second oldest church in Kolkata. The Church is situated at  R. N Mukherjee Road in Kolkata, in the Indian state of West Bengal.

History
Lord Clive invited Johann Zachariah Kiernander, a Swedish Lutheran missionary from south India to settle in Kolkata to promote Christian knowledge. Mr. Kiernander established the Old Mission Church in 1770. Initially the church was known as Lal Girja (Red Church).

References

1770 establishments in India
Churches in Kolkata
Churches completed in 1770
Neoclassical church buildings in India

External links